Grecale may refer to

 Grecale (wind)
 Grecale (ship)—a tugboat originally named Empire Simon
 Italian destroyer Grecale
 Maserati Grecale, a compact luxury crossover SUV